St. John's High School is a Roman Catholic private high school located in Delphos, Ohio, United States. It is located in Allen County, and is part of the Roman Catholic Diocese of Toledo. The school's mascot is the Blue Jay. The school is associated with the Midwest Athletic Conference for sports.

Ohio High School Athletic Association State Championships

 Football - 1997, 1998, 1999, 2005, 2008, 2010 
 Boys Basketball – 1949, 1983, 2002 
 Girls Basketball – 1977, 1979, 1980, 1987, 2002
 Boys Golf - Andy Miller 1998

Notable alumni
Tom Nomina, former defensive tackle for the Denver Broncos and the Miami Dolphins

References

External links
 School Website

Catholic secondary schools in Ohio
Education in Van Wert County, Ohio
High schools in Allen County, Ohio
Delphos, Ohio